Victor Santillan Perez (born 22 July 1995) is a light flyweight boxer from the Dominican Republic who won a bronze medal at the 2015 Pan American Games.

Professional boxing career
Santillan began his competitive career as an amateur and went on to amass an amateur record of 200 wins against 25 losses. His standout moment of success came in 2015, as he was able to capture the bronze medal in the light flyweight category of the 2015 Pan American Games.

Santillan made his professional debut against Louis Rios on 7 April 2018. He won the fight by first-round technical knockout. Santilla amassed a 9–0 record before being booked to face Jose Armando Valdes Bernal for the vacant WBA Fedecaribe bantamweight title on 15 May 2021, at the Gimnasio Estancio in Santo Domingo, Dominican Republic. He captured his first professional title by unanimous decision, with two scorecards of 96–93 and one scorecard of 98–92.

Santillan made his first step-up in competition on 11 June 2022, when he faced the once-defeated Carlos Caraballo, The fight was booked as the co-main event for the WBO NABO super middleweight title bout contested by Edgar Berlanga and Roamer Alexis Angulo. Santillan won the fight by unanimous decision, with scores of 78–74, 77–75 and 78–74. Santillan faced Renson Robles on 16 December 2022. He won the fight by a sixth-round technical knockout.

Professional boxing record

References

External links

 
 Victor Santillan - amateur boxing record at Boxing-Scoop.com

1995 births
Living people
Dominican Republic male boxers
Pan American Games bronze medalists for the Dominican Republic
Pan American Games medalists in boxing
Boxers at the 2015 Pan American Games
Light-flyweight boxers
Medalists at the 2015 Pan American Games